Gene Kermit Verble (June 29, 1928 – November 4, 2017) was an American shortstop and second baseman in Major League Baseball. Nicknamed "Satchel", he played a full season for the 1951 Washington Senators, as well as for part of the Senators' 1953 campaign, batting .202 with 40 hits, 17 runs batted in and no home runs in 81 games and 198 at bats.

Verble threw and batted right-handed, and stood 5'10" (1.78 m) tall and weighed 163 pounds (74 kg). He had a 14-season minor league playing career, much of it in the Double-A Southern Association playing for the Atlanta Crackers and Chattanooga Lookouts. He managed in the Washington/Minnesota Twins organization from 1957 through midseason 1961, including a stint at the Triple-A level with the 1961 Syracuse Chiefs of the International League. His 1957 Charlotte Hornets team won the Class A Sally League championship. In 1962, his final season in baseball, Verble managed the Burlington Indians, the Cleveland Indians' Class B Carolina League affiliate. His record as a minor league pilot was 387–392 (.497).

Verble died on November 4, 2017 at the age of 89.

References

 Spink, J.G. Taylor, publisher. The Official 1952 Baseball Register. St. Louis; The Sporting News, 1952.

External links
 Minor and major league statistics, from Baseball Reference

1928 births
2017 deaths
Atlanta Crackers players
Baseball players from North Carolina
Burlington Bees players
Charlotte Hornets (baseball) players
Chattanooga Lookouts players
Kingsport Cherokees players
Major League Baseball infielders
Major League Baseball shortstops
Major League Baseball second basemen
People from Concord, North Carolina
Seattle Rainiers players
Syracuse Chiefs managers
Vicksburg Billies players
Washington Senators (1901–1960) players